Lyra is a feminine given name of Greek and Latin origin meaning lyre. It is usually given in reference to the constellation and the Greek myth that inspired its naming. The name has associations with music and harmony and the night sky. The name has recently increased in usage due to a character in His Dark Materials, a book trilogy by Philip Pullman, and the television show and film adapted from the books.

Usage
The name has been among the one thousand most used names for newborn girls in the United States since 2015 and among the five hundred most used names for American newborn girls since 2021. The name has ranked among the top five hundred most used names for newborn girls in England and Wales since 2009 and among the top one hundred names since 2020. Usage of the name was first recorded in Ireland in 2009, when three Irish girls were called Lyra. The name was among the top three hundred names for girls in Ireland in 2021, when nineteen newborn Irish girls were given the name.

People

As a given name
 Lyra McKee (1990–2019), Northern Irish journalist and author
 Lyra Taylor (1894–1979), social worker and lawyer from New Zealand
 Lyrae van Clief-Stefanon (born 1971), American poet

As a surname
 Nicholas of Lyra (1270–1349), influential Biblical exegete
 Carlos Lyra (born 1939), Brazilian musician
 Carmen Lyra (1887–1949), pseudonym of female Costa Rican writer, born Maria Isabel Carvajal Quesada
 Cristina Lyra (born 1976), Brazilian sports and newscaster
 Débora Lyra (born 1989), Brazilian actress, model and beauty pageant titleholder
 Fernando Lyra (1938–2013), Brazilian politician who served as Minister of Justice
 João Lyra (1931–2021), Brazilian businessman and politician
 Markus Lyra (born 1945), Finnish retired diplomat

Stage name
 Lyra, Irish singer-songwriter and musician, Laura Brophy

Characters
 Lyra Belacqua, one of the two protagonists in Philip Pullman's His Dark Materials trilogy
 She-Hulk (Lyra), a Marvel Comics superhero
 Lyra, a character in the game and anime Mega Man Star Force
 Lyra (Pokémon), the female player character in Pokémon HeartGold and SoulSilver
 Lyra Heartstrings, a background character in My Little Pony: Friendship Is Magic
 Lyra (Silver Key), a Celestial Spirit character in Fairy Tail
 Lyra Erso, a character in the Star Wars universe
 Lyra Dawnbringer, an angel in Magic: The Gathering
 Lyra, a hero in the Vainglory (video game) MOBA game

Notes